Roche Bros. Supermarkets, Inc. is a chain of supermarkets based in Mansfield, Massachusetts. The company's stores are primarily located in the Boston Metro Area. Roche Bros. also operates the supermarket chain Sudbury Farms.

A third banner, Brothers Marketplace, primarily the next-generation concept of the brothers Ed and Rick Roche, has five locations: the first one was opened in Weston, Massachusetts and a second in Medfield, Massachusetts, both in 2014. Since then three more have been opened: Waltham, Massachusetts in 2018, Duxbury, Massachusetts in 2019, and Cambridge, Massachusetts, also in 2019. The Waltham location closed nearly 3 years after it opened in May 2021.

History 
Pat and Bud Roche opened their first store in Roslindale, Massachusetts in 1952 as a meat and produce shop. The store expanded to include groceries in 1957. The brothers later passed down the company to their sons Jay, Ed, and Rick Roche.

On April 29, 2015, a Roche Bros. store opened in Boston's Downtown Crossing in the space formerly occupied by the original Filene's Basement.

As of May 2019, the chain had 15 Roche Bros. and two Sudbury Farms locations.

Controversy 
Roche Bros came under fire after promoting ghost pepper writer sauce which was intended to promote the Roman Polanski film ghost writer. Polanski was arrested at the Beverly Wilshire Hotel for the sexual assault of 13-year-old Samantha Gailey.

Locations 
Roche Bros. Supermarkets, Inc. currently operates  in 20 locations.

Roche Bros. 
 Acton, Boston, Bridgewater, Easton, Marshfield, Mashpee, Millis, Natick, Needham, Watertown,Wellesley, Westborough, West Roxbury, Westwood

Sudbury Farms 
 Needham, Sudbury

Brothers Marketplace 
Cambridge, Duxbury, Medfield, Weston,

References 

Supermarkets of the United States
American companies established in 1952
Retail companies established in 1952
Privately held companies based in Massachusetts
Companies based in Massachusetts